Charles Black (19282012) produced counterfeit British and U.S. currency together with traveller's cheques for a number of years before being arrested. As a testament to his skills, his techniques rendered the U.S Department of the Treasury's detection equipment obsolete. He was born in Lewisham, London.

It was while he was in prison, serving a sentence for car-ringing, that he was introduced to the art of forgery. Black's mastery of the subject could only be exclaimed at by those responsible for his arrest and conviction.

He was locked inside for a jail term for the forgeries.

Upon release, Charles married a Thai national, and set up his introductions firm which was the first of its kind, starring in over 13 talk shows in the United Kingdom including Trisha and Vanessa talking about the subject of Mail Order Brides.

His book Counterfeiter: The Story of a Master Forger was published in 1989.

In Scotland Yard's celebrated Black Museum of criminal artefacts, where over 500 items are preserved at a constant temperature of 62 degrees Fahrenheit, a special place is reserved for a set of printing plates, a remarkable series of forged bank-notes, and a cunningly hollowed out kitchen door once used to conceal some of them.

Further reading

External links

1928 births
2012 deaths
English counterfeiters
20th-century English businesspeople